Evaldas Šaulys (born 4 March 1993) is a Lithuanian basketball player for Pieno žvaigždės Pasvalys of the Lithuanian Basketball League (LKL).

National team career 

Šaulys won gold medal with the Lithuanian team during the 2017 Summer Universiade after defeating the United States' team 74–85 in the final.

References

1993 births
Living people
Basketball players from Klaipėda
BC Mažeikiai players
BC Neptūnas players
BC Šiauliai players
BC Šilutė basketball players
BC Sūduva-Mantinga players
Lithuanian men's basketball players
Medalists at the 2017 Summer Universiade
Small forwards
Universiade gold medalists for Lithuania
Universiade medalists in basketball